Farampator (developmental code names CX-691, ORG-24448, SCH-900460) is an ampakine drug. It was developed by Cortex Pharmaceuticals, and licensed to Organon BioSciences for commercial development. Following the purchase of Organon by Schering-Plough in 2007, the development license to farampator was transferred. The development of farampator was eventually terminated, reportedly due to concerns about cardiac toxicity.

Farampator has been investigated for its effect on AMPA receptors and researched for potential use in the treatment of schizophrenia and Alzheimer's disease. It was found to improve short-term memory, but impaired episodic memory. It produced side effects such as headache, somnolence and nausea. Subjects reporting side effects had significantly higher plasma levels of farampator than subjects without. Additional analyses revealed that in the farampator condition the group without side effects showed a significantly superior memory performance relative to the group with side effects.

See also
 AMPA receptor positive allosteric modulator

References

AMPA receptor positive allosteric modulators
Ampakines
Benzoxadiazoles
Carboxamides
Experimental drugs
1-Piperidinyl compounds
Enones